António José Rafael (11 November 1925 – 29 July 2018) was a Roman Catholic bishop.

Rafael was born in Portugal and was ordained to the priesthood in 1948. He served as bishop of the Roman Catholic Diocese of Bragança-Miranda, Portugal, from 1979 to 2001.

Notes

1925 births
2018 deaths
20th-century Roman Catholic bishops in Portugal
People from Bragança, Portugal